Le Vert may refer to:
 Octavia Walton Le Vert, a popular antebellum socialite and author, also known as Madame Le Vert.
 LeVert, an R&B group from Ohio, USA
 Le Vert, Deux-Sèvres, a commune in western France